The Global Standards Symposium (GSS) is a statutory meeting that precedes the World Telecommunication Standardization Assembly (a quadrennial conference of the International Telecommunication Union, ITU). GSS provides a high-level forum for discussion and coordination open to all. The GSS was created by the ITU's treaty-making conference, the Plenipotentiary Conference 2006 in Antalya, Turkey with Resolution 122.

GSS 20 
GSS 20 was scheduled to be held in Hyderabad, India in 2020,but due to the COVID-19 pandemic it was rescheduled and took place on 28 February 2022 at International Conference Centre Geneva (CICG) in Geneva, Switzerland. The theme of GSS-20 was "International standards to enable the digital transformation and achieve the Sustainable Development Goals (SDGs)". The GSS conclusions were forwarded to WTSA-20 for consideration. 

Speakers at the symposium included:
 Nele Leosk (Symposium Chair) Ambassador-at-Large for Digital Affairs, Ministry of Foreign Affairs, Estonia
 Ghana Minister Ursula Owusu
 Tunisia Minister Nizar Ben Néji 
 South Africa Minister Khumbudzo Ntshavheni
 Costa Rica Vice Minister 
 UNECE Executive Secretary Oľga Algayerová
 ITU-T Director Chaesub Lee
 Valencia Major Joan Ribó
 Jean Todt, UN Special Envoy for Road Safety
 Fraunhofer HHI Executive Director Thomas Wiegand
 Marcus Shingles, CEO, Exponential Destiny
 Philippe Metzger, General Secretary, International Electrotechnical Commission
 Hossam El-Gamal, Executive President, National Telecom Regulatory Authority, Egypt
 Javier Garcia Diaz, Director General, Spanish Association for Standardization, Spain
 Jung Hae-Yong, Vice Mayor for Economic Affairs, Daegu, Republic of Korea
 Martín Olmos, Undersecretary of Information and Communications Technology, Argentina
 Gil Reichen, Mayor, Pully, Switzerland

GSS 16
The third Global Standards Symposium (GSS 16) was held on 24 October 2016 in Hammamet, Tunisia. The symposium was opened by the Minister of Telecommunications of Tunisia Dr . Speakers included:

 Mongi Marzoug
 Houlin Zhao
 Chaesub Lee

GSS 12
The second Global Standards Symposium (GSS 12) was held on 18 November 2012 in Dubai, United Arab Emirates. The symposium was  opened by ITU Secretary-General Hamadoun Touré.

GSS 08 
The first Global Standards Symposium (GSS 08) was held on 20 October 2008 in Johannesburg, South Africa. The Symposium was opened by Minister of Telecommunications of South Africa Ivy Matsepe-Casaburri.

ITU Plenipotentiary Conference 2006 
Upon the instruction of the ITU Plenipotentiary Conference (2006, Antalya) the organisation of a Global Standards Symposium as a public forum, to take place before any World Telecommunication Standardization Assembly, was decided (Resolution 122).

References 

International Telecommunication Union